The KTM 990 Adventure is a dual-sport motorcycle  produced in Austria by KTM. The bike is powered by the LC8 liquid cooled, four-stroke, DOHC  999 cc 75° V-twin engine, 
The engine was evolved from the 950 Adventure.
The engine also featured a revised camshaft and the carburetor was replaced with the electronic fuel injection. Brakes are Brembo two-channel ABS, except the S and the R versions which have no ABS.

References

External links

Dual-sport motorcycles
990 Adventure
Motorcycles introduced in 2006